Pamber is a civil parish located in the north of Hampshire, England, near the border with Berkshire. The parish population at the 2011 Census was 2,613. It contains four settlements: Pamber Heath, Pamber Green, Pamber End and Little London.

Formerly part of Basingstoke Rural District, it is now part of Basingstoke and Deane district.

References

External links

 

Civil parishes in Basingstoke and Deane